Baynard House may refer to:

in England
Baynard House, London

in the United States

Bannister Hall and Baynard House, Smyrna, Delaware, listed on the National Register of Historic Places (NRHP)
Ephriam M. Baynard House, Auburndale, Florida, NRHP-listed
Stoney-Baynard Plantation, Hilton Head Island, South Carolina, NRHP-listed

See also
Baynard Boulevard Historic District, Wilmington, Delaware, NRHP-listed